State Route 289 (SR 289) is a highway in Santa Cruz County, Arizona that runs from its junction with Interstate 19 (old ) to the north of Nogales, to Peña Blanca Lake. It is an east–west route.

Route description
SR 289 is a  highway that serves Peña Blanca Lake, passing through sparsely inhabited territory. It does not pass through any cities or towns. The highway eventually curves back towards the west until it turns north towards the lake. There is a Y junction where the road branches off to the lake to the north and a forest road that continues west that connects to a very scenic drive through the Coronado National Forest. This road passes Arivaca Peak, Sycamore Canyon, the ghost town of Ruby and continues west to the town of Arivaca and SR 286. This stretch requires four-wheel drive and there are no services along the entire stretch.

History 
An unpaved road existed along the current route since 1935. The route was established as SR 289 in 1959, when it only ran west from US 89 to the Coronado National Forest boundary. The next year, the route was extended westward to Peña Blanca Dam. By 1971, US 89 at SR 289's eastern terminus was replaced by I-19.

Junction list

References

External links
 Arizona Roads

289
Transportation in Santa Cruz County, Arizona